Charles Adam Ott Jr. (September 26, 1920 – December 9, 2006) was a United States Army major general who served as commander of the 40th Armored Division and 40th Infantry Division, and director of the Army National Guard.

Early life
Charles Adam Ott Jr. was born on September 26, 1920, in Santa Barbara, California, the son of Charles Adam Ott Sr. and Leona Elizabeth (Theote) Ott. He attended the public schools of Santa Barbara and was a 1937 graduate of Santa Barbara High School. Ott graduated from Stanford University with a Bachelor of Arts degree in economics in 1941 and was the Honor Graduate of his Reserve Officers' Training Corps class.

World War II
Commissioned as a second lieutenant of artillery, Ott completed the Artillery Officer Basic Course in 1941, the Artillery Officer Advanced Course in 1942, and the United States Army Command and General Staff College in 1943.

Ott served in Europe during the war, first with the 76th Field Artillery Battalion, including assignments as battery commander, battalion operations and training officer (S-3), executive officer, and commander. He later served as operations and training officer for the 18th Field Artillery Group, and carried out an assignment in California on the staff of the Sixth United States Army. He was a lieutenant colonel when he was discharged in 1946.

Interbellum
After the war, Ott returned to Santa Barbara and pursued a business career as an executive of his family's business, Ott Hardware, and he became the company's president upon the retirement of his father. He also served as president of Sterling Supply Corporation and Channel Properties, Incorporated.

Ott continued his military career with the California Army National Guard as commander of the 981st Field Artillery Battalion.

Korean War
In 1950, Ott was called to federal service with the 40th Infantry Division for the Korean War. He served as commander of the division artillery, and received a promotion to colonel.

Senior command
In 1952, Ott was promoted to brigadier general as commander of the 40th Armored Division Artillery.

Ott was assigned as assistant division commander of the 40th Armored Division in 1958.  In 1960, he was promoted to major general and assigned as commander of the 40th Armored Division.
In August, 1965, Ott commanded the division when it was activated in response to the Watts Riots.

Ott also served as commander of the California National Guard's Southern Emergency Operations Center and commander of the 79th Rear Area Operations Support Center.

In 1969 he commanded National Guard members activated in response to flooding in Santa Barbara County and other areas of Southern California.

In 1971, he was named deputy commander of the California National Guard, and in January 1974, he received an appointment as commander of the 40th Infantry Division.

In 1974, Ott was appointed director of the Army National Guard, serving until his 1978 retirement.

Ott's awards included the Army Distinguished Service Medal, Legion of Merit, Bronze Star Medal, Air Medal, and Army Commendation Medal.

Later career
After retiring from the military, Ott served as director of the Arizona Division of Emergency Services.

Ott died at Santa Barbara Cottage Hospital on December 9, 2006. He is buried at Santa Barbara Cemetery, Summit Lot 683, Grave 03.

Family
In February 1943, Ott married Patricia Jane Parrish. They were the parents of three children—Lesley Jane, Chris, and Mila Lee.

References

External links
 Charles A. Ott Jr. at Santa Barbara High School Alumni Association

1920 births
2006 deaths
United States Army generals
National Guard (United States) generals
United States Army personnel of World War II
United States Army personnel of the Korean War
Recipients of the Distinguished Service Medal (US Army)
Recipients of the Legion of Merit
Recipients of the Air Medal
United States Army Command and General Staff College alumni
Stanford University alumni
People from Santa Barbara, California
Military personnel from California